Mikhail Starostin (born 24 February 1955) is a former international speedway rider from the Soviet Union.

Speedway career 
Starostin hold the Russian record for National Championships and he won the Soviet Union Individual Speedway Championship seven times during the period from 1975 until 1991.

He reached the final of the Speedway World Championship in the 1979 Individual Speedway World Championship and the 1982 Individual Speedway World Championship.

World final appearances

Individual World Championship
 1979 –  Chorzów, Silesian Stadium – 13th – 3pts
 1982 -  Los Angeles, Memorial Coliseum - 16th - 0pts

World Team Cup
 1981 -  Olching, Speedway Stadion Olching (with Valery Gordeev / Viktor Kuznetsov / Nikolay Kornev / Anatoly Maksimov) - 4th - 3pts (0)

References 

1955 births
Living people
Russian speedway riders
Sportspeople from Ufa